Fort Clinton (originally known as Fort Arnold) was an American Revolutionary War fort located near West Point, New York. Commanded by and named after Benedict Arnold before his betrayal of the United States and defection to the British Army, the fortification was renamed after General James Clinton. The grounds of the fort eventually became part of the United States Military Academy; both Fort Clinton and the current academy are commonly known as West Point.

History 

Construction of the fort was begun under Captain Louis de la Radiere, and completed under Colonel Tadeusz Kościuszko between 1778–1780; it was the key defensive fortification, overlooking the turn in the Hudson River and the Great Chain.

In 1778, Major General Israel Putnam wrote, "The place agreed upon to obstruct the navigation of Hudson river was at West Point." "As the governor's brother, Colonel James Clinton, and his brigade would build the main fort, it was to be named after him." The southern and western walls were nine feet high and twenty feet thick. Three redoubts and batteries on the south were named Forts Meigs, Wyllys and Webb.

After the war, the remains of the fort fell into disrepair and were eventually demolished to make way for the expansion of the United States Military Academy, founded at the garrison in 1802.  Today, all that remains of Fort Clinton are some earthworks and stone base structures, easily seen off of Thayer Road as it rounds the plain and the soccer fields at West Point.

See also 
Constitution Island
Fort Putnam
Kosciuszko's Garden
Redoubt Four (West Point)

References 

1780 establishments in New York (state)
Clinton
Buildings and structures in Orange County, New York
Clinton
Hudson River
Military installations established in 1780
New York (state) in the American Revolution
Ruins in the United States
United States Military Academy